Iceland competed at the 2016 Summer Olympics in Rio de Janeiro, Brazil, from 5 to 21 August 2016. Since the nation's official debut in 1912, Icelandic athletes have appeared in every edition of the Summer Olympic Games, except for four occasions as a result of the worldwide Great Depression (1920 to 1932).

Due to the absence of the men's handball team, the National Olympic and Sports Association of Iceland sent the nation's smallest delegation to the Games for the first time since the 1968 Summer Olympics in Mexico City. A total of eight athletes, three men and five women, were selected to the Icelandic team, competing only in athletics, judo, swimming, and artistic gymnastics. Attending his third straight Olympics, heavyweight judoka Þormóður Jónsson had been chosen by the committee to carry the Icelandic flag in the opening ceremony. Along with Jónsson, four other athletes also returned for their second Olympic appearance, including javelin thrower Ásdís Hjálmsdóttir, top 12 finalist from London 2012, and swimmers Anton Sveinn McKee, Eygló Ósk Gústafsdóttir, and Hrafnhildur Lúthersdóttir.

Iceland, however, failed to win a single Olympic medal, since the 2008 Summer Olympics in Beijing, where the men's handball squad took the silver in a final match against France. Swimmers Lúthersdóttir (women's 100 m breaststroke) and Gústafsdóttir (women's 200 m backstroke) were the only Icelandic athletes progressing further to the final round for the first time since Örn Arnarson (men's 200 m backstroke) did so in 2000, but both of them finished off the podium.

Athletics
 
Icelandic athletes have so far achieved qualifying standards in the following athletics events (up to a maximum of 3 athletes in each event):

Track & road events

Field events

Gymnastics

Artistic
Iceland has entered one artistic gymnast into the Olympic competition, signifying the nation's sporting comeback after a 12-year hiatus. Russian-born Irina Sazonova became the first Icelandic female to book an Olympic spot in the apparatus and all-around events at the Olympic Test Event in Rio de Janeiro.

Women

Judo

Iceland has qualified one judoka for the men's heavyweight category (+100 kg) at the Games. Þormóður Jónsson earned a continental quota spot from the European region, as the highest-ranked Icelandic judoka outside of direct qualifying position in the IJF World Ranking List of May 30, 2016.

Swimming
 
Icelandic swimmers have so far achieved qualifying standards in the following events (up to a maximum of 2 swimmers in each event at the Olympic Qualifying Time (OQT), and potentially 1 at the Olympic Selection Time (OST)):

References

External links 
 

Olympics
2016
Nations at the 2016 Summer Olympics